Tal Dahab  is a Syrian village located in Salamiyah Subdistrict in Salamiyah District, Hama.  According to the Syria Central Bureau of Statistics (CBS), Tal Dahab had a population of 660 in the 2004 census.

History
In 1838, Tell Dahab's inhabitants were noted to be predominantly Sunni Muslims.

References

Bibliography

 

Populated places in Salamiyah District